To Find Happiness is the seventh studio album by Australian musician, Josh Pyke. The album was announced on 5 November 2021 alongside its fourth single "Circle of Light" and released on 18 March 2022. The album debuted at number 17 and is Pyke's eighth Top 50 album.

Upon announcement, Pyke said "This album was a bit of a surprise, I wasn't planning to make another record straight after Rome, but the juices were flowing, and I didn't want the 'COVID Years' to be defined by inactivity and stalled plans."

Reception
Jeff Jenkins from Stack Magazine said "Pyke, the melody master, crafts pop songs that hit you right in the heart. Check out his track about identity and love, 'If You Don't Know Me, Who Am I?', a powerful and poignant piece inspired by his mum's battle with Alzheimer's. Then there's 'Your Heart Won't Always Weigh a Tonne', a salve to troubled times... A Josh Pyke album might not necessarily deliver happiness, but it will provide a perfect soundtrack for the search."

Track listing

Charts

Release history

References

2022 albums
Josh Pyke albums
Sony Music Australia albums